Bushkan is a village in Bushehr Province, Iran

Bushkan may also refer to:
 Bushkan, Sepidan, Fars Province
 Bushkan-e Deylami, Fars Province
 Bushkan-e Mirzai, Fars Province
 Bushkan District, in Bushehr Province
 Bushkan Rural District, in Bushehr Province